The Carabobo-1 oil field is an oil field located in the Orinoco Belt. It was discovered in 2010 and developed by PDVSA. The oil field is operated and owned by PDVSA.

Indian state-owned company ONGC Videsh Ltd. (OVL) helped certify heavy oil reserves in the Orinoco river belt in 2010. In February 2010, an international consortium comprising OVL, Indian Oil Corporation (IOC), Oil India, Repsol of Spain and Petronas of Malaysia won a global bid to claim a 40% stake worth $1.05 billion in the Carabobo-1 oil field.

See also

List of oil fields

References 

Eastern Venezuela Basin
Oil fields of Venezuela